The East Lancashire line is a railway line in the Lancashire region of England, which runs between Preston and Colne, through Blackburn, Accrington, Burnley (Barracks and Central) and Nelson. The line formerly ran onto Skipton but this closed in 1970.

It is operated by Northern. Services on this line stop at every station on the line, although Pleasington, Hapton and Burnley Barracks are now request stops only. It was designated by the Department for Transport as a community rail line in November 2006.

History 

The line was built by the Blackburn and Preston Railway and the Blackburn, Burnley, Accrington and Colne Extension Railway. Both companies were absorbed by the East Lancashire Railway on 3 August 1846 and 21 July 1845 respectively. The East Lancashire Railway was, in turn, absorbed by the Lancashire and Yorkshire Railway on 13 May 1859.

This  link closed in 1970. The Skipton–East Lancashire Rail Action Partnership campaigns to reinstate it.

In the 1870s the Lancashire and Yorkshire Railway built the North Lancashire Loop (also known as the Great Harwood Loop), a  route through Great Harwood, Simonstone and Padiham, which bypassed Accrington. The line between Padiham and Rose Grove opened in 1875; west of Padiham it opened two years later as a result of difficulties in constructing the embankments between Great Harwood and Simonstone. Regular use of the North Lancashire Loop ceased in 1957; the route closed completely in 1964, with only the section from Rose Grove to Padiham Power Station remaining until 1993.

Services 

Services via the Roses line routing encompass the Calder Valley line semi-fast trains from Blackpool North stopping at Preston, Blackburn, Accrington and Burnley Manchester Road, heading towards West Yorkshire, currently terminating at York.  Since May 2015, trains from Blackburn to Manchester Victoria via  also uses this route, providing a direct link from Accrington and Burnley to Manchester via .

References

External links 

Community Rail Lancashire – The East Lancashire Line

Rail transport in Lancashire
Community railway lines in England
Transport in Blackburn with Darwen
Transport in Burnley
Transport in the Borough of Pendle
Railway lines in North West England